Bass Pro Shops: The Strike is a fishing game developed by Piranha Games and published by XS Games for the Wii, Windows, and Xbox 360 in 2009. A similar title about hunting, Bass Pro Shops: The Hunt, later followed for Wii & Xbox 360 released on June 1, 2010. A Nintendo Switch port, dubbed Bass Pro Shops: The Strike - Championship Edition was released by Planet Entertainment on October 23, 2018.

References

External links
IGN review
Game Pro review
A.V. Club review
Team Xbox review
About.com review

2009 video games
Fishing video games
Video games developed in Canada
Wii games
Windows games
Xbox 360 games
XS Games games